Bradyrhizobium iriomotense is a species of legume-root nodulating, endosymbiont nitrogen-fixing bacterium, first isolated from Entada koshunensis. The type strain is EK05T (= NBRC 102520T = LMG 24129T).

References

Further reading

External links

LPSN

Nitrobacteraceae
Bacteria described in 2010